Phil Hyde (born 22 October 1958) is an Australian former cricketer. He played ten first-class cricket matches for Victoria between 1983 and 1985.

See also
 List of Victoria first-class cricketers

References

External links
 

1958 births
Living people
Australian cricketers
Victoria cricketers
Cricketers from Melbourne